Ralph Paine may refer to:
 
 Ralph Delahaye Paine (1871–1925), American journalist and author
 Ralph Paine, Jr. (1906–1991), his son, American editor and publisher of Fortune magazine

See also
Ralph Payne, 1st Baron Lavington